Krasny Oktyabr is an urban locality (an urban-type settlement) in Kargapolsky District of Kurgan Oblast, Russia. Population:

References

Urban-type settlements in Kurgan Oblast